A shamshir is a type of Persian/Iranian sword with a radical curve. The name is derived from the Persian word shamshīr, which means "sword". The curved "scimitar" sword family includes the shamshir, kilij, talwar, pulwar and nimcha.

A shamshir shekargar is the same as a shamshir, except the blade is engraved and decorated, usually with hunting scenes.

Description

Originally, Persian swords were straight and double edged. Curved sabre blades were Central Asian in origin. There is considerable disagreement between historians as to when these curved blades were first introduced from Central Asia into Persia, and over what period they became adopted and modified into the recognizable Shamshir. Curved blades began to appear in Persia in the 9th century, when these weapons were used by soldiers in the Khorasan region of Central Asia but were not widely adopted. The sword now called a "shamshir" was developed in Persia over a period of time following influence from the Turkic Seljuk Khanate in the 12th century, the Mongol invasion of the 13th century, and finally taking a form distinct from earlier sabres by the 16th century.  The Shamshir had "relatives" in Turkey (the kilij), the Mughal Empire (the talwar), and the adjoining Arabian world (the saif). Over the years blades might be produced in India or the Ottoman empire and rehilted in Persia, and vice versa leading to mongrel swords.

The shamshir is a curved sword, featuring a slim blade that has almost no taper until the very tip. Instead of being worn upright (hilt-high), it is worn horizontally, with the hilt and tip pointing up. It was normally used for slashing unarmored opponents either on foot or mounted; while the tip could be used for thrusting, the drastic curvature of blade made accuracy more difficult. It has an offset pommel, and its two lengthy quillons form a simple crossguard. The tang of the blade is covered by slabs of bone, ivory, wood, or other material fastened by pins or rivets to form the grip. Many of the older Persian shamshir blades are made from high quality crucible wootz steel, and are noted for the fine "watering" on the blades.

Etymology
Although the name has been associated by popular etymology with the city of Shamshir (which in turn means "curved like the lion's claw" in Persian) the word has been used to mean "sword" since ancient times, as attested by Middle Persian shamshir (Pahlavi šmšyl), and the Ancient Greek σαμψήρα / sampsēra (glossed as "foreign sword").

"Shamshir" is usually taken to be the root of the word scimitar, the latter being a broader term.

See also
 Acinaces
 Arab swords
 Mameluke sword
 Pulwar

References

External links

Middle Eastern swords
Persian words and phrases
Single-edged swords
Iranian inventions
Turkish inventions
Weapons of Iran
Weapons of the Ottoman Empire